Hayet Omri (born December 13, 1981, in Regueb) is a Tunisian politician and inventor. A former member of Ennahda, she was elected to the Assembly of the Representatives of the People in the 2014 Tunisian parliamentary election for the Sidi Bouzid Governorate.

References 

1981 births
Living people
21st-century Tunisian politicians
21st-century Tunisian women politicians
Ennahda politicians
Members of the Assembly of the Representatives of the People
People from Sidi Bouzid Governorate
Tunisian inventors
Tunisian engineers
Tunisian women engineers